Algot Christoffersson was a Swedish footballer who played as a defender. He played 150 matches and scored five goals for Malmö FF from 1923 to 1933.

References

Association football defenders
Swedish footballers
Allsvenskan players
Malmö FF players
Year of birth missing
Year of death missing